"Remember about the Gas Do not buy Russian goods!" was a nonviolent resistance social boycott of Russian goods in Ukraine that arose as a reaction to political pressure of the Russian Federation on Ukraine in the gas conflict of 2005–2006. The campaign had started in December 2005, probably with putting up flyers by unknown activists in Kropyvnytskyi (Kirovohrad in 2005). After publicity, this idea had been taken by other social and political organizations. Active actions were being continued in this campaign, mainly in the gas conflict of 2005–2006 and 2008–2009 between Ukraine and the Russian Federation.

Course of events

2005 
December 2005, unknown activists in Kropyvnytskyi handed around leaflets with the words "Remember about the gas", "Do not buy Russian goods" and the image of Gas pipe at the height of the Gas conflict between Russia and Ukraine. News about it was published by online newspaper "Ves' Kirovohrad". On December 22, and the next few days the news had been reposted by several publications. On December 22 the news appeared on the website "Maidan" by activists of Alliance "Maidan". On the December 23 the news with calling for a boycott of Russian goods, printing, distributing leaflets, and stickers, sending messages and emails from E-mail with such appeals had been appeared on website "Maidan". According to activists, on December 24, the news had been reporting Ukrainian news sites and later Russian, then the campaign had gained publicity a popularity.

2006 
On 4 January 2006, in Rivne social movement "" and the party People's Union "Our Ukraine" presented nationwide initiative "Blackmail no! Independence yes!" Among other things, the launch of the first nationwide boycott of Russian goods was announced at a press conference.

On 4 January 2006, in Kyiv on Khreschatyk street activists held the first event calling not buy Russian. Young people was supported by singer Maria Burmaka.

In early January 2006, "Ukrainian National Assembly" called for a boycott of Russian goods.

2009 
On 1 January 2009, Russian Federation had stopped supplying natural gas to Ukraine's during the new Ukrainian-Russian gas conflict. Gas transit pipeline was completely blocked. That same evening, activists of the Alliance "Maidan" spread through the Internet call for a boycott of Russian goods, recalling the experience of the campaign in 2005–2006. Actions of the Russian authorities to Ukraine gas were called racketeering: "Once more in the early days of the New Year Moscow and its "Gazprom" started gas racket against Ukraine. But every Ukrainian has also leverage on an aggressive neighbor, NOT CONSUME ITS OUTPUT!"

In January 2009, the idea was picked up by several social media. In particular, it was called to a boycott of Russian goods during the action against Russia's policy towards Ukraine in Kyiv and Lviv.

Gallery

Reactions 
In December 2005, former Rada Chairman Volodymyr Lytvyn said he would not send his friends any SMS with the text "Remember about the Gas Do not buy Russian goods", because he believes that it will increase the ethnic strife.

In 2006, scientists of the Institute of State and Law of the National Academy of Sciences Ukraine expressed that the campaign resulted in strengthening agitation Party of Regions and Viktor Yanukovych during the election campaign in 2006 parliamentary elections to the introduction of Russian as a second language in Ukraine, and for closer integration of Ukraine with Russia within the Common Economic Space.

After putting up flyers in Kropyvnytskyi by unknown activists, several grocery stores stopped to do orders of Russian chocolate and beer "Baltika".

According to activists in early 2006 Spiritual Directorate of Buddhists Ukraine "Ninhma in Ukraine" supported its decision to boycott Russian goods. On their website they allegedly hung a banner "Do not buy Russian goods!"

Estimations 
According to historian Yaroslav Svatko he expressed in February 2006, the campaign was unexpected for the Russian government and led to unexpected consequences for her spontaneous, decentralized distribution in society the idea of separation of Ukrainian interests of Russia.

Name 
From the beginning of the campaign name came from the phrase "Remember about the gas" and "do not buy Russian goods" probably with leaflets those were handed by unknown activists in Kropyvnytskyi. It was used by the activists of Alliance "Maidan" as "Remember the gasdo not buy Russian goods!" In that form phrase was most particularly through the media. But also phrase "Remember the gas do not buy Russian goods" (without the exclamation mark) was widely used. In 2009, the option "Remember the gas! Do not buy Russian goods!" It was also used as well as other derivative forms.

Successors 
In August 2013, a public campaign with a similar name and concept emerged in response to the export blockade of Ukraine by Russia. It also got wide publicity and distribution in Ukraine. It was called "Do not buy Russian goods!" Later one more campaign appeared "Boycott Russian Films".

See also 

 Black Pora!
 Russia–Ukraine relations

References

Sources
 Акція «Не купуй російських товарів!» . List of news of Alliance "Maidan". Maidan Wiki. 9 January 2006.

2000s in Ukraine
2005 neologisms
Anti-Russian sentiment
Boycotts of Russia
Russia–Ukraine gas disputes
Slogans